Cleithrolepis is an extinct genus of ray-finned fish from the Triassic.

It had a weak lower jaw with teeth only at the tip.

Cleithrolepis lived in rivers, billabongs and lakes in the large braided river system that deposited the Hawkesbury Sandstone in what is now New South Wales, with fossils found in shale lenses within the sandstone.

References
 Fossils (Smithsonian Handbooks) by David Ward (Page 213)

External links
Fossil of freshwater fish, Cleithrolepis granulata - Somersby, New South Wales, Middle Triassic, 240 million years ago.

Triassic bony fish
Prehistoric neopterygii
Mesozoic fish of Europe
Prehistoric bony fish genera